Eolacertidae is an extinct family of lacertoid lizards known from the Paleocene and Eocene of Europe. They are the closest known relatives of Lacertidae.

Genera 

 Eolacerta Nöth, 1940 Conglomérat de Cernay, France, Paleocene, Tienen Formation, Belgium, Eocene, Lignites de Soissonnais, France, Eocene, Geiseltal, Messel Pit, Germany, Eocene
 Stefanikia Čerňanskýa and Smith, 2017 Messel Pit, Germany, Eocene

References 

Lacertoidea
Prehistoric reptile families